Elis Eiler (born 13 August 1990) is a Liechtensteiner footballer who plays as a midfielder for Rot-Weiß Rankweil and the Liechtenstein national football team.

Career statistics

International

References

1990 births
Living people
Women's association football midfielders
Liechtenstein women's international footballers
Liechtenstein women's footballers